"When You Wish Upon a Weinstein" is the twenty-second episode of the third season of the American animated series Family Guy, and the original series finale. The episode was intended to air on Fox during 2000, but Fox's executives expressed concern due to the content's potential to be interpreted as anti-Semitic, and did not allow it to air on television in that year. The episode originally aired on Cartoon Network's Adult Swim on November 9, 2003, and on Fox on December 10, 2004. In the episode, Peter prays for a Jew to help him with his financial woes. After befriending Jewish accountant Max Weinstein and discovering the wonders of their religion, Peter gets the idea of converting Chris to Judaism so he will be successful in life. Lois attempts to stop him, believing that success is not based on religion.

"When You Wish Upon a Weinstein" was written by Ricky Blitt and directed by Dan Povenmire. This episode features guest performances from Andrea Beutener, Mark Hamill, Phil LaMarr, Ed McMahon, Peter Riegert, Mary Scheer, Ben Stein, and Nicole Sullivan.

Plot
Peter gives Lois's "rainy-day fund" to Jim Kaplan, a scam artist selling volcano insurance. That night, Stewie breaks Meg's glasses because he hates being watched while he sleeps. Lois tells Peter that he needs to recover the money to buy their daughter a new pair of glasses. After hearing Quagmire and Cleveland talk about how men with Jewish-sounding names have helped them achieve financial success, Peter decides that he needs a Jew to handle his money in an elaborate musical number.

When a Jewish man named Max Weinstein has car trouble outside the Griffin house, Peter takes it as a sign. After a foot chase, Peter pressures Max into helping him get the emergency money back, and he recovers the money from Kaplan. After inviting Max to dinner and accompanying him to a Reform synagogue, Peter comes to the conclusion that Chris would become smart and successful if he converted to Judaism. The two sneakily drive to Las Vegas for a quickie Bar Mitzvah.

Lois learns of the Bar Mitzvah from Brian (by means of torturing him with a dog whistle), and borrows Quagmire's car. She arrives just in time to stop the ceremony, but the congregants, angry that Lois is apparently insulting their religion, attack the Griffins. The family escapes just in time, locking the synagogue's door using a large star of David and getting back home on a bus. Lois points out that one's success is not based upon religion, and Peter realizes the error of his ways and makes up to the family. However, as it turns out, the bus is full of nuns who, displeased that Peter strayed from Catholicism, attack the family with rulers.

Cultural references
Peter's song, "I Need a Jew", is a parody of "When You Wish Upon a Star". The scene where Lois tries to stop the Bar Mitzvah is a parody of the ending of The Graduate.

Production

"When You Wish Upon a Weinstein" was written by Ricky Blitt and directed by Dan Povenmire.

In addition to the regular cast, voice actress Andrea Beutener, actor Mark Hamill, voice actor Phil LaMarr, actor Ed McMahon, actor Peter Riegert, actress Mary Scheer, actor Ben Stein, and voice actress Nicole Sullivan guest starred in the episode. Recurring guest voices in the episode include Mike Barker, Ricky Blitt, Mike Henry, Danny Smith, and Wally Wingert.

Though the episode was aired during the third season, it was produced in 2000 and is a holdover from the second season production. Fox network executives were concerned that the episode could be construed as anti Semitic, and decided not to air the episode after it had completed post production. It aired on Cartoon Network's programming block Adult Swim in 2003, and then it aired on Fox in 2004.

On the DVD commentary for the episode, Seth MacFarlane mentions that he showed the script of the episode to two rabbis, both of whom approved the episode "because Peter learns the right lesson at the end". MacFarlane also points out that 70% of the show's writers are Jewish, including Ricky Blitt, who wrote the episode, as is Ben Stein, who plays the Rabbi.

Reception and lawsuit
Lisa Keys of The Forward wrote that the episode is "not necessarily demeaning to Jews" but "too vapid to be funny".

On October 3, 2007, the Bourne Company publishing house, sole owner of the song "When You Wish Upon a Star", filed a lawsuit against several Fox divisions, Cartoon Network, Fuzzy Door Productions, Family Guy producer Seth MacFarlane and composer Walter Murphy, claiming copyright infringement over "I Need a Jew", seeking unspecified damages and to halt the program's distribution. The suit claims harm to the value of the song due to the offensive nature of the lyrics.

On March 17, 2009, U.S. District Judge Deborah Batts ruled that the creators of Family Guy did not infringe on Bourne's copyright. 

In granting a motion for summary judgment in the defendants' favor, Batts wrote, "Plaintiff reaps the benefit of their song's association with Pinocchio and Disney, and enjoys its reputation for wholesomeness; it is precisely that beneficial association that opens the song up to ridicule by parodists seeking to take the wind out of such lofty, magical, or pure associations."

References

External links
 

2000 controversies
2000 controversies in the United States
2003 controversies
2003 controversies in the United States
2004 controversies
2004 controversies in the United States
Family Guy (season 3) episodes
2003 American television episodes
Television episodes about Jews and Judaism
Television episodes pulled from general rotation
Jewish comedy and humor
Cultural depictions of Woody Allen
Television controversies in the United States
Race-related controversies in animation
Religious controversies in animation
Race-related controversies in television
Stereotypes of Jewish people
Religious controversies in television
Religious controversies in the United States
Antisemitic works